Frempong is a surname. Notable people with the surname include:

 James Frempong (born 1989), Swedish professional footballer
 , Swiss-Ghanaian singer and electronic music artist

See also
 Frimpong